Sinjapyx is a genus of diplurans in the family Japygidae.

Species
 Sinjapyx cupellii (Silvestri, 1928)
 Sinjapyx davidoffi Silvestri, 1948
 Sinjapyx denisi Silvestri, 1948
 Sinjapyx modicus Silvestri, 1948

References

Diplura